Calliobothriidae is a family of cestodes in the order Tetraphyllidea.

References

Cestoda